Kalyan Airstrip is an abandoned World War II airstrip at Nevali 6 km south of Kalyan railway station and 55 km north of Mumbai airport, India. The airfield served RAF Kalyan and was abandoned after the war. It is owned by the Ministry of Defence but has been encroached upon.
In 2006, the site was proposed as a candidate for the second airport for the Mumbai Metropolitan Region. However, this proposal was abandoned in February 2014 as the Maharashtra government dropped the idea of examining alternative sites, having secured all necessary approvals for the Navi Mumbai International Airport at Panvel.

History

The airfield at Nevali was used by the RAF pilots during World War II to give operational cover to the Bombay region. Post-Independence, ownership of the land was transferred to the Ministry of Defence. In June 2017, the Navy began constructing a boundary wall to protect the remaining land from further encroachment, since around 400 acres of the land was encroached upon over the years. A small portion of the land is used by the Bhabha Atomic Research Centre (BARC) for research activities.

Proposal to use site for International Airport
In October 2006 the Government of Maharashtra first proposed the Kalyan-Nevali site as a candidate for a second airport for the Mumbai Metropolitan Region. However, the Ministry of Civil Aviation was not very keen on the idea and wanted to focus on the second airport in Navi Mumbai. The Kalyan site was proposed because, compared to the Panvel site, the total area of the Nevali Airbase was over  relatively free of any natural obstacles and, unlike the Panvel site, there was no possibility of CRZ (Coastal Regulatory Zone) violations, flattening of mountains or diversion of any rivers. The Union Ministry of Environment and Forests had raised environmental objections on the proposed location of the Navi Mumbai International Airport near Kopra Panvel area, because the construction of the airport would involve reclamation of low-lying areas in an ecologically fragile zone as well as destruction of several hectares of mangroves. Hence the State Government proposed several alternate sites, one of which centred on a  piece of land owned by the Airports Authority of India near Kalyan

In August 2007, the national security advisor (NSA) had communicated to the state chief minister that the airport could not be developed on the 1,800 acres of defence ministry land due to safety and security reasons because a R&D laboratory of Bhabha Atomic Research Centre (BARC) was being constructed in the adjacent area.
The proposal was also opposed by farmers in the Kalyan-Ambarnath belt who contended that the project would require more land than what was available with AAI, thus affecting around 22,000 farmers from 18 villages in the vicinity of the site.

The state government dropped the idea of examining alternative sites in February 2014 as it had secured all necessary approvals for the Panvel site.

Location
The site is located on Haji Malang Road at Nevali village, 6 km south of Kalyan railway station and 55 km away from the Chatrapati Shivaji International Airport at Sahar in Mumbai. It lies close to urban areas of the Kalyan Dombivli Municipal Corporation. The nearest railway station is Kalyan railway station on the Central Railway of the Mumbai suburban railway network. The site can also be accessed from State Highway 2 (Kalyan-Murbad-Ahmednagar highway) and the NH 160 (Nashik-Thane national highway) which was earlier numbered NH 3 before renumbering of all national highways by National Highway Authority of India in 2010 year.

References

External links
Maha govt seeks approval for another airport this one in Kalyan
2nd Airport for Mumbai and how not to build it by Dorab Sopariwala

Airports in Maharashtra
Airports in Mumbai
World War II sites in India
Defunct airports in India
Kalyan-Dombivli
1920s establishments in India
Airports established in the 1920s
20th-century architecture in India